Fay Marbe (1899–1986) was an American stage actress, singer and dancer. She also appeared in a handful of films including the 1929 comedy The Talk of Hollywood. 

Marbe was the daughter of William Marbe.

During the mid-1920s Marbe toured Europe. She retired in the early 1930s.

Marbe's younger brother Gilbert often danced with her on stage.

References

Bibliography
 Munden, Kenneth White. The American Film Institute Catalog of Motion Pictures Produced in the United States, Part 1. University of California Press, 1997.
 Slide, Anthony. The Encyclopedia of Vaudeville. University Press of Mississippi, 2012.

External links

1899 births
1986 deaths
American stage actresses
American dancers
American film actresses
American silent film actresses
20th-century American actresses
People from New York City